The Tyler Morning Telegraph is a daily newspaper based in Tyler, Texas, United States. It is privately owned by M. Roberts Media.

History
The newspaper begin publishing weekly in 1877 as the Weekly Courier. In 1882, the Daily Courier began publishing daily. In 1906, the Daily Courier and the Weekly Times consolidated into The Tyler Courier-Times. In 1910, the newspaper sold to the Butler family.

The newspaper's Sunday edition is known as the Tyler Morning Telegraph. The Tyler Courier-Times was a sister afternoon paper published until 1995.

The paper uses a white letter T over a blue circle as its logo, changing from the previous stylized paperboy. The paper bills itself as "the Tyler Paper" in advertising and elsewhere, including its URL.

It does not publish on Christmas Day.

On November 28, 2018, T.B. Butler Publishing announced the sale of the Tyler Morning Telegraph to media company, M. Roberts Media New ownership went into effect on December 1, 2018, ending 108 years of ownership by the Butler family.

Controversy
In its Friday, January 8, 2021 edition, the newspaper incorrectly captioned an Associated Press photo of the 2021 storming of the United States Capitol with "members of Antifa dressed as supporters of President Donald Trump".  The newspaper issued a retraction, and published multiple follow-up articles detailing how the mistake occurred.

References

External links

Daily newspapers published in Texas
Tyler, Texas